The Minister of Foreign Affairs is the senior minister at the Ministry of Foreign Affairs in the Estonian Government. The Minister is one of the most important members of the Estonian government, with responsibility for the relations between Estonia and foreign states.

The Foreign Minister is chosen by the Prime Minister as a part of the government. The current Foreign Minister is Urmas Reinsalu.

Office holders

See also
Foreign relations of Estonia

References

External links
Ministry of Foreign Affairs official web site
https://www.un.org/webcast/ga/61/pdfs/estonia-e.pdf

Foreign relations of Estonia
Foreign Affairs
Minister of Foreign Affairs
 Minister
Estonia diplomacy-related lists